Roxane Schcolnic Vaisemberg (born 25 July 1989) is a retired Brazilian tennis player. She reached a career-high singles ranking of world No. 236 on 8 August 2011 and a best doubles ranking of No. 162 on 10 December 2007.

ITF Circuit finals

Singles: 20 (14–6)

Doubles: 44 (21–23)

External links
 
 

1989 births
Living people
Brazilian female tennis players
Brazilian people of German descent
Tennis players from São Paulo
South American Games gold medalists for Brazil
South American Games medalists in tennis
Competitors at the 2006 South American Games